"Ifuleave" is the second single from Musiq Soulchild's fifth studio album, OnMyRadio, his second full-length release on Atlantic Records. The song features R&B singer Mary J. Blige.

Charts

Weekly charts

Year-end charts

References

2008 singles
Musiq Soulchild songs
Mary J. Blige songs
2008 songs
Atlantic Records singles
Songs written by Ivan Barias
Songs written by Carvin Haggins
Songs written by Miguel (singer)
Songs written by Musiq Soulchild
Song recordings produced by Carvin & Ivan